Sar Kahaki (also Romanized as Sar Kahakī; also known as Kūhakī and Sar Kūhakī) is a village in Howmeh-ye Sharqi Rural District, in the Central District of Ramhormoz County, Khuzestan Province, Iran. At the 2006 census, its population was 522, in 109 families.

References 

Populated places in Ramhormoz County